Woodland High School was a high school in East Point, Georgia, United States.

Woodland opened in September 1982 as the result of the merger of Briarwood High School and Headland High School.  Headland's campus became Paul D. West Middle School.

West Middle School was set up to feed into Woodland High.  At the time, Fulton was slowly introducing the middle school concept countywide.

The school closed in 1988 when it was combined with Russell High School, College Park High School and Hapeville High School to form Tri-Cities High School.

Woodland has since become Woodland Middle School.  The original building was demolished for the current middle school prototype.

References

1988 disestablishments in Georgia (U.S. state)
Educational institutions disestablished in 1988
Educational institutions in the United States with year of establishment missing
Former high schools in Georgia (U.S. state)
Fulton County School System high schools
East Point, Georgia